Route 15 is a highway in northeast Missouri.  Its northern terminus is at the Iowa state line about thirteen miles (19 km) north of Memphis; its southern terminus is at U.S. Route 54 in Mexico.  

Route 15 is one of the original 1922 Missouri highways, though its southern terminus was significantly farther at Route 71 (now U.S. Route 65) at Buffalo.  It was replaced by U.S. Route 54 from Mexico to southwest of Macks Creek and by Route 73 from that point to Buffalo.

Major intersections

References

External Links

015
Transportation in Audrain County, Missouri
Transportation in Monroe County, Missouri
Transportation in Shelby County, Missouri
Transportation in Knox County, Missouri
Transportation in Scotland County, Missouri
U.S. Route 54